This is the discography of recordings by Duke Ellington, including those nominally led by his sidemen (mainly in the 1930s and early 1940s), and his later collaborations (mainly in the 1960s) with musicians with whom Ellington had generally not previously recorded.

This chronology of this discography is based on year of the record released, with recording dates noted if the record was released years later. All studio albums and live albums released during Ellington's lifetime are included, while his posthumous discography is limited to significant releases, as the official bootlegs and unauthorized compilations are innumerous.
 
The US chart listing information should be considered tentative because sources, like Joel Whitburn's Pop Memories, do not take the cheaper dime-store records into account.

Hit records

Early years: 1920–1940s 
During the 1920s and 1930s, Ellington and his band recorded for almost every label (BluDisc, Pathé, Perfect, Victor, Brunswick, Columbia Records, Okeh, Vocalion, Cameo, Romeo, Lincoln, Banner, Domino, Jewel, and Hit of the Week). By the 1940s, Ellington's recordings featuring Jimmy Blanton and Ben Webster, garnered praise of his work as being "the best Ellington", according to critic Bob Blumenthal.

Activity in the commercial recording industry was restricted during the 1942–1944 musicians' strike which including a recording ban, but Ellington did make annual visits to Carnegie Hall. In the January 1943 concert, Ellington introduced his first extended suite, "Black, Brown and Beige".

As the long-player format didn't become a significant part of the industry until the late 1940s, Ellington's record output before 1947 consisted largely of singles, from labels such as RCA Victor, Okeh, and Brunswick. They represent the bulk of his work that has been collected in box sets, while material from other labels is scattered. The most comprehensive source for Ellington's early work are the multi-volume The Chronological Duke Ellington & His Orchestra Classics releases, although that series omits alternate takes, which can be found in other collections.

10-inch LPs 
Duke Ellington Plays the Blues (1947) 
Liberian Suite (1948) (Columbia) – 10-inch LP

Live albums 
Black, Brown, and Beige (1946) (Victor)

1950s
Ellington began the 1950s with his career seemingly in decline with several musicians leaving, Lawrence Brown, Sonny Greer, and Johnny Hodges, although Brown and Hodges later rejoined. After the orchestra's appearance at the 1956 Newport Jazz Festival, with Paul Gonsalves running through 27 choruses of "Diminuendo and Crescendo in Blue", Ellington's profile revived.

Studio albums 
1952
Ellington Uptown (1952) (Columbia)

1953
Premiered by Ellington (1953) (Capitol)
The Duke Plays Ellington (1953) (Capitol)

1954
Dance to the Duke! (Capitol)
Duke Ellington Plays

1955
Ellington '55 (1955) (Capitol)
Ellington Showcase (1955) (Capitol)

Blue Rose with Rosemary Clooney (1956) (Columbia)
Duke Ellington Presents... (1956) (Bethlehem)

A Drum Is a Woman (1957) (Columbia)
Such Sweet Thunder (1957) (Columbia)
Ella Fitzgerald Sings the Duke Ellington Song Book with Ella Fitzgerald (1957) (Verve)

Black, Brown and Beige (1958) (Columbia)
Ellington Indigos (1958) (Columbia)
Duke Ellington at the Bal Masque (Columbia)
The Cosmic Scene (1958) (Columbia)

Jazz Party (1959) (Columbia)
Back to Back: Duke Ellington and Johnny Hodges Play the Blues with Johnny Hodges (1959) (Verve)
Side by Side with Johnny Hodges (1959) (Verve)
Anatomy of a Murder (1959) (Columbia) – soundtrack album
Festival Session (1959) (Columbia)

Live albums 
The Seattle Concert (1954) (RCA Victor)
Ellington at Newport (1956) (Columbia)
Duke Ellington and the Buck Clayton All Stars at Newport (1956) (Columbia)
Newport 1958 (1958) (Columbia) – live concert with studio work, later full concert released as Live at Newport 1958.
Live at the Blue Note (1959) (Roulette)

1960s
In the 1960s, Ellington made recordings with Louis Armstrong, Count Basie, John Coltrane, Ella Fitzgerald, Coleman Hawkins, and Frank Sinatra, among others. He continued to write and record extended suites, such as his religious "Sacred Concerts", the "Perfume Suite", and the "Latin American Suite".

Studio albums 
Blues in Orbit (1960) (Columbia)
The Nutcracker Suite (1960) (Columbia)
Piano in the Background (1960) (Columbia)
Swinging Suites by Edward E. and Edward G. (1961) (aka Peer Gynt Suite/Suite Thursday)
Piano in the Foreground (Columbia)
The Great Reunion with Louis Armstrong (1961) (Roulette)
Together Again with Louis Armstrong (1961) (Roulette)
Paris Blues (1961) (United Artists)
First Time! The Count Meets the Duke with Count Basie (1961) (Columbia)

All American in Jazz (1962) (Columbia)
Midnight in Paris (1962) (Columbia)
Duke Ellington Meets Coleman Hawkins with Coleman Hawkins (1963) (Impulse!)
Duke Ellington & John Coltrane with John Coltrane (1963) (Impulse!) – recorded 1962
Money Jungle with Charles Mingus and Max Roach (1963) (United Artists)

Afro-Bossa (1963) (Reprise)
The Symphonic Ellington (1964) (Reprise)
My People (1965) (Red Baron)

Ellington '65 (1965) (Reprise)
Duke Ellington Plays Mary Poppins (1965) (Reprise)
Ellington '66 (1965) (Reprise)
Ella at Duke's Place with Ella Fitzgerald (1965) (Verve)
Serenade to Sweden with Alice Babs (1966) (Reprise) – recorded 1965

Far East Suite (1967) (RCA)

...And His Mother Called Him Bill (1968) (RCA)
Francis A. & Edward K. with Frank Sinatra – (1968) (Reprise)
North of the Border in Canada with the Ron Collier Orchestra (1969) (Decca) – recorded 1967

Singles 

 "The Asphalt Jungle" (1961) (Columbia)

Live albums 
Concert in the Virgin Islands (1965) (Reprise)
The Duke at Tanglewood with the Boston Pops Orchestra conducted by Arthur Fiedler (1966) (RCA Victor)
A Concert of Sacred Music from Grace Cathedral (1966) (Status)
Soul Call (1967) (Verve)
The Stockholm Concert, 1966 with Ella Fitzgerald (1967) (Pablo) 
Ella and Duke at the Cote D'Azur with Ella Fitzgerald (1967) (Verve)
Second Sacred Concert (1968) (Prestige)

1970s

Studio albums 
New Orleans Suite (1970) (Atlantic)
Orchestral Works (1970) (Decca)
Latin American Suite (1972) (Fantasy) – recorded 1968 & 1970

This One's for Blanton! – with Ray Brown (1973) (Pablo)

It Don't Mean A Thing If It Ain't Got That Swing with Teresa Brewer (1973) (Flying Dutchman)
Recollections of the Big Band Era (Atlantic) – recorded for Reprise 1962–63
Duke's Big 4 (1974) (Pablo)

Live albums 

70th Birthday Concert (1970) (Solid State)
Togo Brava Suite (1971) (United Artists)
Jazz at the Plaza Vol. II (1973) (Columbia) – recorded 1958
The Great Paris Concert (1973) (Atlantic) – recorded 1963
Yale Concert (1973) (Fantasy) – recorded 1968

Other projects

Rerecording projects 

 Masterpieces by Ellington (1951) (Columbia)
 Historically Speaking (1956) (Bethlehem)
 The Popular Duke Ellington (1967) (RCA)

Session appearances 

The Complete Porgy and Bess (1956) (Bethlehem) – limited involvement of "Duke Ellington and his Famous Orchestra"

Posthumous 
Listed here are all notable studio and live albums released following Ellington's death.

Studio albums 

 The Pianist (1974) (Fantasy) – recorded 1966 & 1970, released 1974
 The Afro-Eurasian Eclipse (1975) (Fantasy) – recorded 1971
 Duke Ellington's Jazz Violin Session (1976) (Atlantic) – recorded 1963
 The Ellington Suites (1976) (Pablo) – recorded 1959–72
 The Intimate Ellington (1977) (Pablo) – recorded 1969–71
 Unknown Session (1979) (Columbia) – (recorded 1960)
 Up in Duke's Workshop (1979) (Pablo) – recorded 1969–72
 Featuring Paul Gonsalves (1985) (Fantasy) – recorded 1962
 The Intimacy of the Blues (1986) (Fantasy) – recorded 1967–70
The Jaywalker (2004) (Storyville) – recorded 1966–1967

Live albums 

 Third Sacred Concert (1975) (RCA) – recorded 1973
Eastbourne Performance (1975) (RCA) – recorded 1973
The Carnegie Hall Concerts: December 1947 (1977) (Prestige) – recorded 1947
The Carnegie Hall Concerts: January 1943 (1977) (Prestige) – recorded 1943
The Carnegie Hall Concerts: December 1944 (1977) (Prestige) – recorded in 1944
The Carnegie Hall Concerts: January 1946 (1977) (Prestige) – recorded 1946
Duke Ellington at Fargo, 1940 Live (2001) (Storyville) – recorded 1940
All Star Road Band (1983) (Doctor Jazz) – recorded 1957
All Star Road Band Volume 2 (1985) (Doctor Jazz) – recorded 1964
In the Uncommon Market (1986) (Pablo) – recorded 1963–66
Hot Summer Dance (1991) (Red Baron) – recorded 1960
 Live at the Whitney (1995) (Impulse!) – recorded 1972
 Duke Ellington at the Alhambra (2002) (Pablo) – recorded 1958

Live appearances 

 The Greatest Jazz Concert in the World (1975) (Pablo)

Compilations
Listed here are all compilations released during Ellington's lifetime, in addition to all significant compilations, excluding the aforementioned box sets.

Contemporaneous 
Ellingtonia, Vol. One (Brunswick, 1943) – album of four 78-rpm discs containing sides from the period 1927–1931
Ellingtonia, Vol. Two (Brunswick, 1944) – album of four 78-rpm discs containing sides from the period 1928–1931
The Duke and His Men (1955)
Here's the Duke (1955) (Columbia)
Duke's Mixture (1955) (Columbia)
In a Mellotone (1956) (RCA Victor) – LP release of selected 1940–1942 titles
Ellington Moods (1959) (Jazz Legacy LP)/The Duke's D.J. Special (Fresh Sound Records)
Daybreak Express (1964)
Great Times! with Billy Strayhorn (1964) (Riverside)
Jumpin Punkins (1965) (RCA Victor) – LP release of selected 1940 and 1941 titles
Johnny Come Lately (1967)
The Girl's Suite and The Perfume Suite (1982) (Columbia) – recorded in 1957 & 1961
The Blanton–Webster Band (1940–1942 [1986], RCA/Bluebird)
Braggin' in Brass: The Immortal 1938 Year (1991) (Portrait)
Happy Reunion (1985) (Sony) – two sessions from 1958

Posthumous 
Studio Sessions, Chicago 1956 (LMR) – released as The Private Sessions Volume One in 1987
Dance Concerts, California 1958 (LMR) – released as The Private Sessions Volume Two in 1987
Studio Sessions, New York, 1962 (LMR) – released as The Private Collection Volume Three in 1987
Studio Sessions New York 1963 (LMR) – released as The Private Collection Volume Four in 1987
Dance Dates, California 1958 (LMR) – released as The Private Sessions Volume Six in 1987
Studio Sessions 1957 & 1962 (LMR) – released as The Private Collection Volume Seven in 1987
Studio Sessions, 1957, 1965, 1966, 1967, San Francisco, Chicago, New York (LMR) – released as The Private Collection Volume Eight in 1987
Studio Sessions New York, 1968 (1987) (LMR) – released as The Private Collection Volume Nine
Studio Sessions New York & Chicago, 1965, 1966 & 1971 (LMR) –  released as The Private Collection Volume Ten in 1987
The Suites, New York 1968 & 1970 (1988) (LMR) – released as The Private Collection Volume Five
Never No Lament: The Blanton-Webster Band (Bluebird, 1940–1942) – 3-CD set released 2003 from the Centennial set of 1999
The Duke Box 2 (Storyville) – 7-CD/1-DVD set, recorded 1952 to 1972.
The Private Collection (1956–1971) (Saja) – 10-CD set)
Duke Ellington's Incidental Music for Shakespeare's Play Timon of Athens, adapted by Stanley Silverman (1993). Posthumous recordings of previously unreleased compositions.

References

External links
AllMusic Duke Ellington discography page
Discogs Duke Ellington page
 Discography of American Historical Recordings, University of California Santa Barbara
 Duke on the Web, The illustrated encyclopedia of Duke Ellington's records
 Ellingtonia.com – "Duke Ellington Complete Discography"
 Red Hot Jazz – concentrates on Ellington's recordings in the 1920s
  A Duke Ellington Panorama
 The Duke Ellington Society, TDES, Inc.
 The Dooji Collection of Duke Ellington's 78 RPM record labels
http://ellingtonweb.ca/

Jazz discographies
Discographies of American artists